Havrysh is a surname. Notable people with the surname include:

 Mariya Havrysh (1931–2001), Ukrainian swimmer
 Stepan Havrysh (born 1952), Ukrainian politician
 Vitaliy Havrysh (born 1986), Ukrainian footballer